The Kazyr is a river in the Irkutsk Oblast and Krasnoyarsk Krai of Russia. At its confluence with the Amyl, the Tuba (a right tributary of the Yenisey) is formed. Its name translates from the Tuvan language as "savage". It is covered by ice from late October to late April. The Kizir is a major tributary.

References

Rivers of Krasnoyarsk Krai
Rivers of Irkutsk Oblast